Shanghai No. 3 Girls' High School is a key public all-female high school in Shanghai, China. The predecessors of the school were St. Mary's Hall, established in 1881, and McTyeire School, established in 1892.

In 1952, these two schools were taken over by the People's Government of Shanghai and merged into "Shanghai No. 3 Girls' High School".

Heidi Ross, author of "Historical Memory, Community Service, Hope: Reclaiming the Social Purposes of Education for the Shanghai McTyeire Schools for Girls," noted that McTyeire had a reputation for being elitist and privileged. She added that the school provided a sense of stability and isolation from problems during World War II.

Location
The campus is located at 155 Jiangsu Road, Changning District, Shanghai, China. The total area of the campus is 80 mu or about 53360 m².

Alumnae
Famous alumnae include Soong Ching-ling, Honorary Chairwoman of the People's Republic of China, Soong Mei-ling, Soong Ai-ling (The Soong Sisters), Eileen Chang, one of the most influential modern Chinese writers, Businesswoman Rosalyn Chin-Ming Chen, Zung Wei-tsung, journalist and YWCA leader , etc.

Education Mission
Shanghai No. 3 Girls' High School encourages students to be "IACE girls", in which "IACE" stands for "Independence, ability, care, and elegance". The motto is to capture some distinct characters that have been inspiring the students as well as alumnae to become leading females of their ages.

Independence
Being willing to take on responsibilities, owning our choices, and thinking critically.

Ability
Being capable and confident of who we are and what we can do, studying hard, facing up to challenges, and being proactive.

Care
Caring for peers, team, nature, country, and society.

Elegance
Having dignity, humbleness and courtesies.

Besides regular academic courses, Shanghai No. 3 Girls' High School values quality education. To make students more comprehensive across disciplines, the school provides a wide range of options of elective courses, including mock driving, Chinese tea ceremony, western table manners, baking, etc.

Administration

Principal
Xu Yong-chu

Academics
Every year, Shanghai No.3 Girls' High School delivers a large number of outstanding graduates to top-tier universities throughout China including Peking University, Tsinghua University, Fudan University, Jiao Tong University, Tongji University, etc., as well as high-ranking education institutions all over the world. 

Students from all grades are active in various high-school contests and personal projects in the fields of science, literature, foreign languages, sports, etc.

References 
 Ross, Heidi. "Historical Memory, Community Service, Hope: Reclaiming the Social Purposes of Education for the Shanghai McTyeire Schools for Girls." In: Peterson, Glen, Ruth Hayhoe, and Yongling Lu (editors). Education, Culture, and Identity in Twentieth-century China. The University of Michigan Press, 2001. , 9780472111510. Start: p. 375.

External links 
Shanghai No. 3 Girls' High School
Shanghai No. 3 Girls' High School

Notes

2.

High schools in Shanghai
Girls' schools in China
Educational institutions established in 1952
Educational institutions established in 1892
1952 establishments in China
1892 establishments in China